Eucalyptus singularis, also known as ridge-top mallet, is a species of mallet that is endemic to Western Australia. It has smooth bark, sometimes with ribbons of rough bark at the base, lance-shaped adult leaves, flower buds usually in groups of seven, pale yellow flowers and cylindrical to barrel-shaped fruit.

Description
Eucalyptus singularis is a mallet that typically grows to a height of  but does not form a lignotuber. It has smooth greyish bark, sometimes with ribbons of rough grey to brown bark at the base. Flowering occurs in November and December and the flowers are pale yellow.

Taxonomy and naming
Eucalyptus singularis was first formally described in 2001 by Lawrie Johnson and Donald Blaxell from a specimen collected north of Ravensthorpe by Barbara Briggs and Johnson in 1984. The specific epithet (singularis) is a Latin word meaning "along" or "solitary", referring to the habit of this species compared to others in the E. incrassata group.

Distribution and habitat
This mallet grows in shallow sand over laterite north-west of Ravensthorpe towards Lake Magenta, Dragon Rocks and Dumbleyung in the Esperance Plains and Mallee biogeographic regions.

Conservation status
This eucalypt is classified as "not threatened" by the Western Australian Government Department of Parks and Wildlife.

See also
List of Eucalyptus species

References

Eucalypts of Western Australia
Trees of Australia
singularis
Myrtales of Australia
Plants described in 2001
Taxa named by Lawrence Alexander Sidney Johnson